Tibor Harangozo was a male Yugoslav international table tennis player.

Table tennis career
He won a silver medal at the 1939 World Table Tennis Championships in the Swaythling Cup (men's team event) with Žarko Dolinar, Adolf Herskovic, Ladislav Hexner and Max Marinko for Yugoslavia.

Personal life
His younger brother Vilim Harangozo (1925-1975) was also an international table tennis player.

In 1969 Tibor Harangozo opened a shop for table tennis accessories in Saarbrücken, Germany, which was named Tibhar after him.
Tibhar Tibor Harangozo GmbH has since become one of the main global table tennis brands

See also
 List of table tennis players
 List of World Table Tennis Championships medalists

References

Yugoslav table tennis players
1922 births
1978 deaths
World Table Tennis Championships medalists